Filippo Volandri was the defending champion, but he did not qualify that year.
Diego Schwartzman won the title, defeating Guilherme Clezar in the final, 6–2, 6–3.

Seeds

Draw

Finals

Group A
Standings are determined by: 1. number of wins; 2. number of matches; 3. in two-players-ties, head-to-head records; 4. in three-players-ties, percentage of sets won, or of games won initially to sort out a superior/inferior player, then head-to-head records; 5. ATP rankings.

Group B
Standings are determined by: 1. number of wins; 2. number of matches; 3. in two-players-ties, head-to-head records; 4. in three-players-ties, percentage of sets won, or of games won initially to sort out a superior/inferior player, then head-to-head records; 5. ATP rankings.

References
Main Draw

Finals
2014 Singles
2014 in Brazilian tennis